Song Chunli (born 17 February 1951) is a Chinese film and television actress. She won two Golden Rooster Award for Best Actress, a Hundred Flowers Award for Best Supporting Actress and two Feitian TV Awards.
Her recent work is television series Mother (2011).

Filmography
便衣警察 (1987) (TV)
风雨丽人 (1991) (TV)
Jiuxiang (1996)
The Days Without Lei Feng (1997)
To Be With You Forever (2001)
Mother (2011) (TV)
Chinese Look (2013)
The Galaxy on Earth (2014)
A Promise to the Kurichenko's (2015)
Story of Yanxi Palace (2018)

References

External links
 

1951 births
Living people
Actresses from Hebei
People from Hengshui
Chinese television actresses
Chinese women television presenters
Chinese television presenters
Chinese broadcasters
Chinese film actresses
20th-century Chinese actresses
21st-century Chinese actresses